Paul ApSimon is a Canadian fencer and coach. He has coached Canadian fencers at the 2000 Summer Olympics, the 2012 Summer Olympics, and the 2016 Summer Olympics. He also coached pentathletes at the 2012 Olympics.

ApSimon has also represented Canada at World and Commonwealth Championships and has numerous National and Provincial Championships to his credit. He is a graduate of the national coaches institute and is currently both Coach at the Excalibur Fencing Club and Head Coach at the RA Fencing Club in Ottawa. As varsity fencing coach at the University of Ottawa, ApSimon coached the men's and women's teams to six consecutive provincial titles. In 1997 he was named Team Leader for the Canadian University Fencing Team at the FISU Games in Sicily. ApSimon coached the women's foil team to a historic gold medal at the 2015 Pan Am Games, a first for any Canadian women in fencing.

He most recently coached modern pentathlon and women's foil for the Canadian 2016 Olympic team.

References 

Canadian male fencers
Living people
Year of birth missing (living people)